Covey-Crump is an English, double-barrelled surname. The name was created when Rev. Walter William Crump (1865–1949) took on the surname of his friend Rev. Richard Covey (1833–1903) in 1903. He formalised the change of his surname to "Covey-Crump" by deed poll in the same year, just before he married. His three sons were registered with the surname "Covey-Crump".

People
The name may refer to the following:
 A.T.L. Covey-Crump (1907–1991), Commander of the Royal Navy and creator in 1955 of the Naval slang compendium Covey-Crump.
 Rogers Covey-Crump (born 1944), British tenor specialising in early music.
 Walter William Covey-Crump (1865–1949) Anglican canon, Freemason, and writer.

Naval slang or "jackspeak" compendium (1955)
 Covey-Crump, a compendium of Naval slang published within the Royal Navy in 1955. It is mentioned in A.T.L. Covey-Crump, Royal Navy#"Jackspeak" and Customs and traditions of the Royal Navy.

See also
 Crump (surname)
 Covey (surname)

Notes

References

English-language surnames